Sirauli is a town and a nagar panchayat in Bareilly district in the Indian state of Uttar Pradesh. One of the most important figures of the town is Mr.Parshuram Pandey who is known for being the former chairman of the town. Shrimati Parveen Fatima is the current Chairperson of the town.

Demographics
 India census, Sirauli had a population of 19,021. Males constitute 53% of the population and females 47%. Sirauli has an average literacy rate of 75%, higher than the national average of 59.5%: male literacy is 81%, and female literacy is 68%. In Sirauli, 20% of the population is under 6 years of age.

References

Cities and towns in Bareilly district